Ghost Lake is a reservoir in Western Alberta, Canada, formed along the Bow River.

Trans-Canada Highway passes a short distance to the south. It was formed in 1929 with the completion of the Ghost Dam, and was developed on land leased from the Nakoda first nations by Calgary Power Ltd.  The lake and dam are primarily used for power generation. The Ghost plant generates an average of 173,000 megawatt hours each year. Calgary Power changed its name to TransAlta Utilities in 1981.

The lake freezes in December until approximately mid-May. Sport fish include lake trout, mountain whitefish, lake whitefish and brown trout.

Large fluctuations in water level due to power generation affect the recreational opportunities and biological productivity of the lake. The volume of water being released from the lake and the variance thereof also affect the Bow River downstream of the dam.

The location brings consistent, strong winds, which make the lake suitable for sailing and iceboating. The Ghost Lake Iceboat Club is located at Ghost Lake. Ghost Lake was also selected as the swimming venue for the inaugural Ironman Calgary 70.3. Only the Ghost Reservoir Provincial Recreation Area between the mouth of the Ghost River and the northeastern end of the lake, right next to the dam, provides public access to the lake.

Gallery

References

Municipal District of Bighorn No. 8
Lakes of Alberta
Bow River
Rocky View County